Trebča Vas is a village on the left bank of the Krka River in the Municipality of Žužemberk in southeastern Slovenia. The area is part of the historical region of Lower Carniola. The municipality is now included in the Southeast Slovenia Statistical Region. The settlement includes the formerly independent village of Mačkin Hrib (or Mačkov Hrib).

The local church is dedicated to Saint Agathius and belongs to the Parish of Žužemberk. It is a medieval building that was restyled in the Baroque style in the 17th century.

References

External links
Trebča Vas at Geopedia

Populated places in the Municipality of Žužemberk